Elena Nikolayevna Beglova (born September 1, 1987) is a Russian basketball player for UMMC Ekaterinburg and the Russian national team.

She participated at the EuroBasket Women 2017.

References

1987 births
Living people
Russian women's basketball players
Basketball players from Moscow
Point guards